Otaniemi Chapel is a Lutheran chapel located in the Otaniemi campus of Aalto University in Espoo, Finland.

History
The chapel was designed by the architect couple Heikki and Kaija Siren for a 1954 architectural competition, completed in 1956 and inaugurated in 1957. Located in the Student Village of the Otaniemi campus, the chapel was originally built by the student union of the Helsinki University of Technology. The students wanted something to remind them of "the wholeness of life and the values of human life" in the middle of their technical studies. The student union sold the chapel to Espoo parish in 1972.

On 22 July 1976 the chapel burned down due to arson but it was built again to its original form in 1978.

The chapel has been gradually renovated in recent years: the technical systems of the building in 2008, the organ in 2009 and the sacristy in 2011.

Architecture
The chapel is located on a small hill in the woods, surrounded by pine and birch trees. The main materials of the chapel are red brick and wood, tying the chapel together with other brick buildings in the campus area, including the main university buildings designed by Alvar Aalto.

The building is entered from a walled courtyard that also has a bell tower. The chapel itself, past a clubroom, has two side walls made of bricks. The parallel walls "channel a progression from a secular to a spiritual view of nature": the altar wall made of glass, opening to the surrounding nature with a white cross standing among the trees. The presence of nature is almost pantheistic.

Functions
The chapel currently belongs to Tapiola parish and hosts baptismal ceremonies, weddings and funerals. It is also the gathering place for many associations, such as Christian student organizations and Bible study groups. The chapel has 150 seats and a 10-stop organ by Kangasala organ factory.

Awards and recognition
In 2009 the chapel was awarded the International Carlo Scarpa Prize for Gardens. The jury called the building "masterly" simple and transparent, hailing the way nature, architecture and society come together at the site.

The National Board of Antiquities has listed the chapel as a nationally significant built cultural heritage site as part of the Otaniemi campus and Docomomo has selected the building as a significant example of modern architecture in Finland.

See also
 Aalto University
 Dipoli

References

External links
 
 Espoo Chapels at Evangelical Lutheran Parishes of Espoo website
 The Guild of the Cross – Christian student organization convening at the chapel

Religious buildings and structures in Finland
Churches completed in 1956
Churches destroyed by arson
Arson in Finland
Modernist architecture in Finland
Buildings and structures in Espoo
Heikki and Kaija Siren buildings